Injury Time is a novel by English author Beryl Bainbridge and first published in 1977 by Duckworth. It won the 1977 Whitbread Book of the Year Award.

Inspiration
Binny's home was based by the author on her own home in Albert Road, Camden Town. There was a block of flats opposite, as in the story and the lounge in the front of the ground floor of the property was open plan with the kitchen at the back. A bathroom led off the hallway with steps down at the rear to the back yard. 

In fact Binny is Beryl herself and Edward, her lover, is a tax lawyer with whom Beryl had an affair in the late 1970s. So the book is semi-autobiographical, as are certain other books by Beryl Bainbridge, although of course the events which develop in the story are fictional. The tax lawyer died in 2011.

The story highlights the author's distaste for the secrecy with which the tax lawyer conducted the affair.

Plot introduction
Edward is married to Helen but having an affair with Binny. Tonight the lovers are holding their first dinner party, although Edward has promised his wife that he will not be home late.  Unfortunately things don't go to plan and the dinner party is gate-crashed by desperate bank-robbers wielding sawn-off shotguns and seeking hostages...

References
 

1977 British novels
Novels by Beryl Bainbridge
Gerald Duckworth and Company books
Novels set in one day